Kichha railway station is a railway station in Udham Singh Nagar district, Uttarakhand. Its code is KHH. It serves Kichha city. The station consists of two platforms. Passenger and Express trains halt here.

Trains 

The following trains halt at Kichha railway station in both directions:

 Bandra Terminus–Ramnagar Express
 Lucknow Junction–Kathgodam Express
 Agra Fort–Ramnagar Weekly Express
 Kanpur Central–Kathgodam Garib Rath Express
 Howrah–Lalkuan Express

References

Izzatnagar railway division
Railway stations in Udham Singh Nagar district